The Henry A. Clark House, also known as The Castle, is a historic house in Wartrace, Tennessee, United States. It was built in 1902 for Henry A. Clark and his wife, Lizzie Cunningham.

The house was designed in the Queen Anne architectural style, with a turret. It has been listed on the National Register of Historic Places since August 30, 1985.

References

National Register of Historic Places in Bedford County, Tennessee
Queen Anne architecture in Tennessee
Houses completed in 1902